The Rio Karma is a digital audio player originally made by the now-defunct Rio. It was released in August 2003. It measures 2.7 × 3 × 0.9 inches (6.9 × 7.6 × 2.3 cm) and weighs 5.5 ounces (160 grams). It has a 20 gigabyte (18.6 gibibyte) hard drive. The Karma is notable for its support of Ogg Vorbis and FLAC playback in addition to the usual MP3 and WMA formats, however it will not play MP2 format. It also bears the distinction of supporting file transfers via Ethernet through its docking station, as well as the standard USB 2.0. It is not supported as a plug and play removable drive, although the program Rio Taxi does allow any data to be stored. Like many Rio players, the Karma's firmware features a 5-band parametric equalizer, cross-fader, true gapless playback, animated menus, dynamic playlist generation and visualizations.

Karma Settings

Playback Screen
The Karma has three options for what is displayed on the play screen
 Progress Indicator
 Profile Indicator
 VU Meter for left and right channels.

Language
Options include English (US), English (UK), German, French, Japanese, Chinese & Spanish.

Dock Settings
For docking, there are four options for the "cradle glow".
 Static, with glow level setting
 Pulse with timecode
 Pulse while charging
 Pulse to music

Orientation
The player can be configured for right-handed or left-handed use. For left-handed use, the screen is inverted.

Modifications
The player uses a 20GB Hitachi Travelstar 1.8" hard drive. It is possible to install a higher data capacity hard drive, commonly 30, 40, or 60GB, though these may be physically larger, requiring case modifications. It is also possible to swap the hard drive for CompactFlash-based storage, as it shares the original IDE drive's signaling pinout.

See also
 Trekstor Vibez
 Empeg Car

References

Digital audio players
Audiovisual introductions in 2003